Armed & Ready is an American adventure reality show that airs on the Travel Channel. It follows the exploits of its host, Kevin Michael Connolly, who was born without legs, as he travels around the United States pursuing various challenges, such as learning how to street luge, joust, or move around in zero gravity.  Connolly said that the challenges were his ideas, and the idea was to show a legless man do actions thought impossible for him.

Episodes

References

External links

2010s American reality television series
2013 American television series debuts
2013 American television series endings
Travel Channel original programming
Television shows about disability